Britt Karin Larsen (born 16 April 1945) is a Norwegian poet, author and government scholar. Larsen debuted as a poet in 1978 with 5 mg blues og andre dikt, and has published many poetry collections and novels since. She is best known for her novel trilogy about Norwegian and Swedish Travellers, De som ser etter tegn (1997), De usynliges by (1998) and Sangen om løpende hester (1999). The trilogy has been called a literary monument for Romany people in Norway. Larsen was given the Norsk PEN's highest freedom prize, the Ossietzky-prisen, in 2000.

Bibliography 
5 mg blues og andre dikt – poem (1978)
Kniven skal du ta vare på – poem (1981)
Før stengetid – poem (1983)
Hvorfor venter vi her? – poem (1986)
Du er likevel til. Brev til et barn som ikke ble født – letters (1989)
Ingenting er helt som før – children's book (1990)
I ly for regnet – novel (1990)
Ørkenhagen – poem (1991)
Engang var vi som vinden – prose (1991)
Det nye havet – Children's book (1991) (Illustrated by Torill Marø Henrichsen)
Alexanders hemmelighet – Children's book (1992)
Ormens øye – novel (1993)
Reise om høsten – novel (1994)
Som snøen faller – novel (1995)
Munnen i gresset – novel (1996)
De som ser etter tegn – novel (1997)
De usynliges by – novel (1998)
Sangen om løpende hester – novel (1999)
Å finne en skog – novel (2000)
Vesle-Hjalmar og kilden – Children's book (2001) (Coauthor Liv Borge. Illustrated by Torill Marø Henrichsen)
Et annet folk –    novel (2001)
Duggpunkt ved daggry – novel (2001)
Det kan komme fine dager – novel (2002)
Fortellinger om kjærlighet – novel (2003)
Som kjærlighet, nesten. En bok om alkohol – prose (2004) (Coauthor Tor Georg Danielsen)
Den humpete veien til førerkortet – non-fiction (2007)
Vesle- Hjalmar og vinterslottet – children's book with Liv Andersen (2009)
Det vokser et tre i Mostamägg – novel (2009)
Himmelbjørnens skog – novel (2010)
Som steinen skinner – novel (2011)
Den lykkelige vandreboka – non-fiction (2011)
Før snøen kommer – novel (2012)
Det synger i lauvet – novel (2013)
Slik treet faller – novel (2013)
Kaldere mot natten – novel (2015)
Av lys er du kommet – novel (2017)

Prizes 
Gyldendal's Endowment 1993
Sarpsborgprisen 1998
Hedmark fylkeskommunes kulturpris 1998
Ossietzky-prisen 2000
Riksmålsforbundets litteraturpris 2001
Amalie Skram-prisen 2001
Dobloug-prisen 2014

References

External links
 Britt Karin Larsen i NRK Authors
 Britt Karin Larsen i Dagbladet Authors
 Britt Karin Larsen i Aftenposten Alex

Norwegian children's writers
20th-century Norwegian poets
1945 births
Living people
Norwegian women poets
Norwegian women children's writers
20th-century Norwegian novelists
21st-century Norwegian novelists
21st-century Norwegian women writers
20th-century Norwegian women writers